B.K.L. Walawalkar Rural Medical College is a full-fledged medical college in Sawarda, Maharashtra. The college imparts the degree Bachelor of Medicine and Bachelor of Surgery (MBBS). It is recognised by the Medical Council of India. 

Selection to the college is done on the basis of merit through the National Eligibility and Entrance Test. Yearly undergraduate student intake is 150.

References

External links 
https://bklwrmc.com/

Medical colleges in Maharashtra
Universities and colleges in Maharashtra
Educational institutions established in 2015
2015 establishments in Maharashtra
Affiliates of Maharashtra University of Health Sciences